Maralnik-2 is a rural locality (a settlement) in Ust-Koksinsky District, the Altai Republic, Russia. The population was 8 as of 2016. There is 1 street.

Geography 
Maralnik-2 is located 19 km south of Ust-Koksa (the district's administrative centre) by road. Verkh-Uymon is the nearest rural locality.

References 

Rural localities in Ust-Koksinsky District